Alvin Anthony Schall (born April 4, 1944) is a Senior United States circuit judge of the United States Court of Appeals for the Federal Circuit.

Early life and education 

Born in New York City, New York, Schall received a Bachelor of Arts degree from Princeton University in 1966 and a Juris Doctor from Tulane University Law School in 1969.

Professional career 

Schall was in private practice in New York City from 1969 to 1973, before becoming an Assistant United States Attorney in the Eastern District of New York from 1973 to 1978. He was chief of the appeals division from 1977 to 1978, and a trial attorney of the civil division of the United States Department of Justice from 1978 to 1987. He was a senior trial counsel from 1986 to 1987. He briefly returned to private practice in Washington, D.C. from 1987 to 1988, and was then an Assistant to the United States Attorney General from 1988 to 1992.

Federal judicial service 

On March 3, 1992, Schall was nominated by President George H. W. Bush to a seat on the United States Court of Appeals for the Federal Circuit vacated by Edward Samuel Smith. Schall was confirmed by the United States Senate on August 12, 1992, and received his commission on August 17, 1992. Schall assumed senior status on October 5, 2009.

References

Sources
FJC Bio

1944 births
20th-century American judges
Assistant United States Attorneys
Judges of the United States Court of Appeals for the Federal Circuit
Living people
Lawyers from New York City
Princeton University alumni
Tulane University Law School alumni
United States court of appeals judges appointed by George H. W. Bush